Lac de Fabrèges is a lake in Pyrénées-Atlantiques, France. At an elevation of 1241 m, its surface area is 0.54 km².

References

Lakes of Pyrénées-Atlantiques